Marcus Llewellyn Dowdell (born May 22, 1970) is a former American football wide receiver in the National Football League (NFL) who played for the New Orleans Saints and Arizona Cardinals. He played college football for the Tennessee State Tigers. He also had a career in the Canadian Football League (CFL) for the Sacramento Gold Miners, Winnipeg Blue Bombers, Edmonton Eskimos, and Calgary Stampeders.

References

1970 births
Living people
American football wide receivers
Canadian football wide receivers
New Orleans Saints players
Arizona Cardinals players
Sacramento Gold Miners players
Winnipeg Blue Bombers players
Edmonton Elks players
Calgary Stampeders players
Tennessee State Tigers football players